The following is a list of synagogues in Tunisia:

Ariana Governorate

Béja Governorate

Ben Arous Governorate

Bizerte Governorate

Gabès Governorate

Gafsa Governorate

Jendouba Governorate

Kairouan Governorate

Kasserine Governorate

Kebili Governorate

Kef Governorate

Mahdia Governorate

Manouba Governorate

Medenine Governorate

Monastir Governorate

Nabeul Governorate

Sfax Governorate

Sidi Bouzid Governorate 
No synagogue is located in the Sidi Bouzid Governorate.

Siliana Governorate 
No synagogue is located in the Siliana Governorate.

Sousse Governorate

Tataouine Governorate

Tozeur Governorate

Tunis Governorate

Zaghouan Governorate 
No synagogue is located in the Zaghouan Governorate.

References

Bibliography

See also 
 History of the Jews in Tunisia

Tunisia
Synagogues